Klampenborg Racecourse (Danish: Klampenborg Galopbane) is a flat horse racing track in Klampenborg in the northern suburbs of Copenhagen, Denmark.

History
The first organized horse races in Denmark were held in Copenhagen in 1770 at the initiative of the British born queen Caroline Mathilde. Regular horse races took places at Copenahgen's Nørre Fælled from the 1820s. The races were moved to the Hermitage Plain in Jægersborg Dyrehave in 1870. The first race there took place on 15 June.

Klampenborg Racetracks (then Klampenborg Væddeløbsbane) was inaugurated in 1910. It was owned by the Association for the Promotion of the Noble Horse Breeding (Foreningen til den Ædle Hesteavls Fremme). It is believed that the tribune was moved from the Exposition Universelle in Paris in 1906.

Racecourse
The racecourse is located adjacent to Jægersborg Dyrehave. The racecourse is circa 2.400 m long. A new tribune designed by Dissing + Weitling was inaugurated in 2000.

Major events
Major races include Scandinavian Open Championship, Dansk Derby and Dansk Oaks.

Cultural references
Klampenborg Racecourse has been used as a film location in the following films:
 Plat eller krone (1937)
 Det store løb (1952)
 Kampen om Næsbygård (1964)
 Krybskytterne paa Næsbygaard (1966)
 Rainfox (1984)
 Krummerne 2 - Stakkels Krumme (1992)

References

External links
 Official website
 Source

Horse racing venues in Denmark
Sport in Gentofte Municipality
1910 establishments in Denmark